Scott Lipsky and Rajeev Ram were the defending champions but decided not to participate.

Chris Eaton and Dominic Inglot won the title, defeating Nicholas Monroe and Jack Sock in the final, 6–7(6–8), 6–4, [19–17].

Seeds

Draw

Draw

References
 Main Draw
 Qualifying Draw

Challenger of Dallas - Doubles
2012 Doubles